James Francis Winn (born September 23, 1959) is a former professional baseball pitcher. He played all or part of six seasons in Major League Baseball from 1983 to 1988.

Biography
Winn was born in Stockton, California and grew up in Clever, Missouri. Winn attended John Brown University in Siloam Springs, Arkansas. On June 8, 1981, he was drafted by the Pittsburgh Pirates in the first round (14th pick overall) of the 1981 amateur draft. Winn made his major league debut on April 10, 1983 with the Pittsburgh Pirates.

Winn played for the Pirates from 1982 to 1986. On March 27, 1987, he was traded by the Pittsburgh Pirates to the Chicago White Sox for John Cangelosi. He was released by the White Sox during spring training in 1988. He signed with the Minnesota Twins shortly thereafter and finished his major league career with them.

References

External links
 

 Baseball Almanac

Major League Baseball pitchers
Pittsburgh Pirates players
Chicago White Sox players
Minnesota Twins players
Gulf Coast Pirates players
Buffalo Bisons (minor league) players
Alexandria Dukes players
Hawaii Islanders players
Portland Beavers players
John Brown Golden Eagles baseball players
Navegantes del Magallanes players
American expatriate baseball players in Venezuela
Baseball players from Stockton, California
1959 births
Living people
People from Christian County, Missouri